George Grant Cleveland (born May 9, 1939), is a Republican member of the North Carolina House of Representatives. He has represented the 14th District (including constituents in eastern Onslow County) since 2005. He is a 25-year veteran of the United States Marine Corps.

He currently resides in Jacksonville, North Carolina, where he has lived for over 25 years. In 2012, Cleveland generated controversy when he stated that the state of North Carolina has "no one in the state of North Carolina living in extreme poverty" during a debate in the House regarding preschool funding. In a conflicting statement, the non-profit group Action for Children in North Carolina cited statistics claiming one in ten North Carolina children live in extreme poverty.

North Carolina House of Representatives
Cleveland first ran for the North Carolina House of Representatives in 2004, where he defeated incumbent Keith Williams in the Republican primary. He has been re-elected a total of 8 times, most recently in 2020.

In February 2017, Cleveland joined with Representatives Michael Speciale (R-Craven), and Larry Pittman (R-Cabarrus) in proposing a constitutional amendment that would allow North Carolina voters to repeal Article I, Section 4 of the North Carolina Constitution.  This article declares "This State shall ever remain a member of the American Union; the people thereof are part of the American nation," and prohibits the state from seceding from the United States of America, and its inclusion in North Carolina's 1868 constitution was a condition for being readmitted into the Union after the Civil War.

During the 2017 session, Cleveland introduced a bill to budget the funds to purchase for the North Carolina State Highway Patrol three rescue helicopters.

H.B. 1050 was introduced by Representative Cleveland in 2018. The bill worked to authorize the Department of Military and Veterans Affairs to apply for Federal Funds for the Expansion of Sandhills 4 State Vets Cemetery and Western Carolina State Cemetery.

Committee assignments

2021-2022 session
Appropriations (Vice Chair)
Appropriations - General Government (Chair)
Homeland Security, Military, and Veterans Affairs (Vice Chair)
Marine Resources and Aqua Culture Committee (Vice Chair)
State Government (Vice Chair)
Transportation (Vice Chair)
Insurance

2019-2020 session
Appropriations (Vice Chair)
Appropriations - General Government Committee (Chair)
Homeland Security, Military, and Veterans Affairs (Chair)
House State and Local Government (Vice Chair)
Transportation (Vice Chair)
Insurance 
Wildlife Resources

2017-2018 session
Appropriations (Vice Chair)
Appropriations - General Government (Chair)
Homeland Security, Military, and Veterans Affairs (Chair)
Transportation (Vice Chair)
State and Local Government I
Wildlife Resources
Agriculture
Judiciary IV

2015-2016 session
Appropriations (Vice Chair)
Appropriations - General Government (Chair)
Appropriations - Information Technology
Homeland Security, Military, and Veterans Affairs (Chair)
Transportation (Vice Chair)
Local Government
Wildlife Resources
Agriculture
Education - K-12
Judiciary III

2013-2014 session
Appropriations (Vice Chair)
Homeland Security, Military, and Veterans Affairs (Chair)
Transportation (Vice Chair)
Government
Agriculture
Education
Judiciary

2011-2012 session
Appropriations
Homeland Security, Military, and Veterans Affairs (Chair)
Transportation
Government
Agriculture
Education
Judiciary

2009-2010 session
Appropriations
Homeland Security, Military, and Veterans Affairs
Transportation
Wildlife Resources
Education

Electoral history

2020
In March 2020, Cleveland, R-Onslow, won the Republican nomination to retain the N.C. House District 14 seat with 68% of the vote. He defeated Democrat Mary Wofford in the general election.

2018
In November 2018, Cleveland beat Isaiah Johnson by almost 18 percentage points.

2016

2014

2012

2010

2008

2006

2004

References

External links
Project Vote Smart - Rep. George Cleveland profile
General Assembly Page 

Living people
1939 births
People from Scranton, Pennsylvania
People from Jacksonville, North Carolina
University of Maryland, College Park alumni
21st-century American politicians
Republican Party members of the North Carolina House of Representatives